James S. Thomas (May 25, 1802October 26, 1874) was the 19th mayor of St. Louis, Missouri.

Thomas served as mayor from 1864 to 1869. He was a Republican.

External links 
St. Louis Historic Preservation: Thomas, James S.
Profile from the St. Louis Public Library

1802 births
1874 deaths
People from Maryland
Businesspeople from Missouri
American bankers
Missouri Republicans
Mayors of St. Louis
19th-century American politicians
19th-century American businesspeople